The Stockholm urban area is the largest and most populous of the statistical localities or urban areas in Sweden. It has no administrative function of its own, but constitutes a continuous built-up area, which extends into 11 municipalities in Stockholm County. It contains the municipal seats of 10 of those. As of 31 December 2019, the population in the Stockholm urban area was 1,593,426 inhabitants, the area , and the population density 4,175 inhabitants/km2. Stockholm urban area is not the same as Metropolitan Stockholm, which is a much larger area.

In 2019, the population of the urban area and the municipalities into which it extends, broken down per municipality was the following:

See also
For administration and government see the respective municipalities in the list above
Stockholm
List of metropolitan areas in Sweden

References

 
Geography of Stockholm County
 
Urban areas in Sweden
Geography of Stockholm